FC Metallurg Aldan was a Russian football team from Aldan. It played professionally in 1992 and 1993 (in 1993 it played in the second-highest Russian First Division).

External links
  Team history at KLISF

Association football clubs established in 1992
Association football clubs disestablished in 1994
Defunct football clubs in Russia
Sport in the Sakha Republic
1992 establishments in Russia
1994 disestablishments in Russia